Isophya is a genus of bush crickets, in the tribe Barbitistini, found from mainland Europe to western Asia.

Species
The Orthoptera Species File lists:
species group costata Brunner von Wattenwyl, 1878
 Isophya boldyrevi Miram, 1938
 Isophya costata Brunner von Wattenwyl, 1878
 Isophya dobrogensis Kis, 1994
 Isophya modestior Brunner von Wattenwyl, 1882
 Isophya stepposa Bey-Bienko, 1954
 Isophya stysi Cejchan, 1957
species group kraussii Brunner von Wattenwyl, 1878
 Isophya brevicauda Ramme, 1931
 Isophya kraussii Brunner von Wattenwyl, 1878
 Isophya pienensis Maran, 1954
 Isophya zubovskii Bey-Bienko, 1954
species group major Brunner von Wattenwyl, 1878
 Isophya major Brunner von Wattenwyl, 1878
 Isophya mavromoustakisi Uvarov, 1936
 Isophya mersinensis Sevgili & Çiplak, 2006
 Isophya salmani Sevgili & Heller, 2006
species group modesta (Frivaldszky, 1868)
 Isophya andreevae Peshev, 1981
 Isophya bureschi Peshev, 1959
 Isophya clara Ingrisch & Pavićević, 2010
 Isophya longicaudata Ramme, 1951
 Isophya miksici Peshev, 1985
 Isophya modesta (Frivaldszky, 1868)
 Isophya plevnensis Peshev, 1985
 Isophya rhodopensis Ramme, 1951
 Isophya tosevski Pavićević, 1983
 Isophya yaraligozi Ünal, 2003
species group pyrenaea (Serville, 1838)
 Isophya altaica Bey-Bienko, 1926
 Isophya beybienkoi Maran, 1958
 Isophya brunneri Retowski, 1888
 Isophya bucovinensis Iorgu, Iorgu, Szövényi & Orci, 2017
 Isophya camptoxypha (Fieber, 1853)
 Isophya ciucasi Iorgu & Iorgu, 2010
 Isophya dochia Iorgu, 2012
 Isophya doneciana Bey-Bienko, 1954
 Isophya fatrensis Chládek, 2007
 Isophya gulae Peshev, 1981
 Isophya harzi Kis, 1960
 Isophya nagyi Szövényi, Puskás & Orci, 2012
 Isophya obtusa Brunner von Wattenwyl, 1882
 Isophya posthumoidalis Bazyluk, 1971
 Isophya pyrenaea (Serville, 1838) - type species (as Barbitistes pyrenaea Serville)
 Isophya sicula Orci, Szovenyi & Nagy, 2010
 Isophya taurica Brunner von Wattenwyl, 1878
species group rectipennis Brunner von Wattenwyl, 1878
 Isophya cania Karabag, 1975
 Isophya ilkazi Ramme, 1951
 Isophya nervosa Ramme, 1931
 Isophya pavelii Brunner von Wattenwyl, 1878
 Isophya rectipennis Brunner von Wattenwyl, 1878
 Isophya stenocauda Ramme, 1951
 Isophya thracica Karabag, 1962
 Isophya triangularis Brunner von Wattenwyl, 1891
species group schneideri Brunner von Wattenwyl, 1878
 Isophya hakkarica Karabag, 1962
 Isophya karabaghi Uvarov, 1940
 Isophya schneideri Brunner von Wattenwyl, 1878
species group speciosa (Frivaldszky, 1868)
 Isophya acuminata Brunner von Wattenwyl, 1878
 Isophya amplipennis Brunner von Wattenwyl, 1878
 Isophya artvin Ünal, 2010
 Isophya bumerangoides Sevgili, Demirsoy & Çiplak, 2012
 Isophya caspica Ramme, 1929
 Isophya gracilis Miram, 1938
 Isophya hitit Ünal, 2010
 Isophya kalishevskii Adelung, 1907
 Isophya nigrosignata Miram, 1938
 Isophya pylnovi Miram, 1938
 Isophya redtenbacheri Adelung, 1907
 Isophya reticulata Ramme, 1951
 Isophya rizeensis Sevgili, 2003
 Isophya rodsjankoi Bolívar, 1899
 Isophya savignyi Brunner von Wattenwyl, 1878
 Isophya speciosa (Frivaldszky, 1868)
 Isophya splendida Naskrecki & Ünal, 1995
 Isophya sureyai Ramme, 1951
 Isophya uludaghensis Sevgili & Heller, 2003
species group straubei (Fieber, 1853)
 Isophya anatolica Ramme, 1951
 Isophya hospodar (Saussure, 1898)
 Isophya staneki Maran, 1958
 Isophya straubei (Fieber, 1853)
species group zernovi Miram, 1938
 Isophya autumnalis Karabag, 1962
 Isophya bicarinata Karabag, 1957
 Isophya bivittata Uvarov, 1921
 Isophya horon Sevgili, 2018
 Isophya karadenizensis Ünal, 2005
 Isophya sonora Sevgili, 2020
 Isophya zernovi Miram, 1938
species group not determined
 Isophya hemiptera Bey-Bienko, 1954
 Isophya kosswigi Demirsoy, 1974
 Isophya lemnotica Werner, 1932
 Isophya pancici Pavićević, 2017
 Isophya radmilae Pavićević, 2017
 Isophya sikorai Ramme, 1951
 Isophya tartara (Saussure, 1898)
 Isophya transcaucasica Ramme, 1930

References

External links

Tettigoniidae genera
Taxonomy articles created by Polbot
Taxa described in 1878